Entertainment Distribution Company (EDC) is a distribution center to which Universal Music Group’s British, German, and American optical disc-manufacturing capabilities (Universal Media & Logistics (UML), formerly PolyGram Manufacturing & Distribution Centers Inc. (PMDC)) were sold during 2004. The company's previous name was Glenayre Technologies. UML France was sold to Cinram earlier.

Entertainment Distribution Company provides supply chain services to music, movies, and gaming companies. In November 2008, its American optical disc-manufacturing operation was sold to Sony DADC for US$26 million.

References

External links
 Official Web Site

Distribution companies of the United States
Universal Music Group